Dobri (Bulgarian: Добри) is a Bulgarian masculine given name that may refer to 
Dobri Bozhilov (1884–1945), Prime Minister of Bulgaria
Dobri Chintulov (1822–1886), Bulgarian poet, teacher and composer 
Dobri Dobrev (1914–2018), Bulgarian ascetic
Dobri Dobrev (footballer) (born 1982), Bulgarian football midfielder
Dobri Dzhurov (1916–2002), Bulgarian politician and military leader
Dobri Hristov (1875–1941), Bulgarian composer
Dobri Veličkovski (1943–2006), Macedonian politician
Dobri Voynikov (1833–1878), Bulgarian teacher, playwright and journalist
Dobri Zhelyazkov (1800–1865), Bulgarian businessman

Bulgarian masculine given names